Hetland may refer to:

Places

Norway
 Hetland, a former municipality near Stavanger in Rogaland county
 Hetland, Tysvær, a village in Aksdal in Tysvær municipality, Rogaland county
 Hetland Church, also known as Frue Church, a church in the city of Stavanger

United States
 Hetland, South Dakota, a town in Kingsbury county, South Dakota

People
 Hetland (surname), a list of people with the surname "Hetland"